Don Ramon Reynado was one of the founders of the town of Bautista, Pangasinan, Philippines, in the year 1900. During the American Military Government, he was appointed governor of that town.

References
 
 

Mayors of places in Pangasinan
Filipino city founders
Year of birth missing
Year of death missing